Ondřej Šourek (born 26 April 1983 in Ledeč nad Sázavou) is former Czech football central defender.

Career

Club
In May 2011, he joined Polish club Podbeskidzie Bielsko-Biała on a two-year contract.

International
He was a part of Czech Republic U-20 and U-21 teams.

Honours

Slavia Prague
 Gambrinus liga: 2007–08

Žilina
 Corgoň Liga: 2009–10

References

External links
 
  
 Official site 

1983 births
Living people
People from Ledeč nad Sázavou
Czech footballers
Czech Republic youth international footballers
Czech Republic under-21 international footballers
Association football central defenders
FC Vysočina Jihlava players
SK Slavia Prague players
MŠK Žilina players
Podbeskidzie Bielsko-Biała players
SK Dynamo České Budějovice players
Slovak Super Liga players
Ekstraklasa players
Czech First League players
Czech National Football League players
Expatriate footballers in Poland
Expatriate footballers in Slovakia
Expatriate footballers in Austria
Czech expatriate sportspeople in Slovakia
Czech expatriate sportspeople in Poland
Czech expatriate sportspeople in Austria
Sportspeople from the Vysočina Region